Jean Philippe Abraham (born June 21, 1982) is a former Canadian football linebacker for the Edmonton Eskimos. In his single season with the Eskimos, he appeared in 9 regular season games and made a single tackle.

References 

1982 births
Living people
Canadian football linebackers
Players of Canadian football from Quebec
Canadian football people from Montreal
Laval Rouge et Or football players
Edmonton Elks players